One-Nine-Seven-Zero is the third English-language studio album by French singer Françoise Hardy. First edition released in United Kingdom, in October 1969, on LP, Asparagus Production/United Artists Records (UAS 29046).

Track list 
Françoise Hardy is accompanied by orchestras Jean-Pierre Sabar (A1-A2-A3-B2-B3-B4-B5-B6), Jean-Claude Vannier (A4-A6), John Cameron (A5), Saint-Preux (B1).

Editions

LP records: first editions in the English-speaking world 
 , 1969: English 3, World Record Co. (ORR 6057).
 , 1970: One-Nine-Seven-Zero, Interfusion (SITFL-933891).
 , 1970: Alone, Reprise records (RS 6397).
 , 1970: One-Nine-Seven-Zero, Interfusion (SITFL 933 891).
 , 1970: Alone, Reprise records (RS 6397).

Reisues on CD 
 , 2000: The Françoise Hardy Collection, HMV/EMI Records (7243 5 26054 2 2).
 , 2013: CD, Midnight Blues – Paris . London . 1968-72, Ace International (CDCHD 1358).

References 

Françoise Hardy albums
1969 albums